Xiamen Media Group (XMG), is a television and radio broadcasting network in Xiamen, China owned by local government. XMG is joined from former media entities in Xiamen, i.e. Xiamen Television and People's Radio Station of Xiamen.

Television channels
 XMTV-1 (News Channel)
 XMTV-2 (Cross-Strait Channel)
 XMTV-3 (Life Channel)
 XMTV-4 (Drama & Movie Channel)
 Xiamen Star (Satellite Channel)
 Xiamen Mobile TV

Radio broadcast frequencies
 News broadcast: FM99.6 MHz&AM1107kHz
 Music broadcast: FM90.9 MHz
 Min-nan-hua broadcast: FM101.2 MHz&AM801kHz
 Economy and traffic broadcast: FM107MHz&AM1278kHz

External links and references

Television networks in China
Mass media in Xiamen
Television channels and stations established in 2004